The 2018 Asian Youth Olympic Games Qualifier for girls' field hockey event will be held from the 25th until 29 April 2018 in Bangkok, Thailand. Only the winner and runner-up are qualifying for the finals.

Qualified teams

Format
The nine teams will be split into two groups of four and five teams. The top two teams of each pool advance to the semifinals to determine the winner in a knockout system. The 3rd placed teams from each pool will play for the 5th/6th place. The and 4th placed teams from each pool and the 5th placed team from pool A will play for the 7th/9th place.

Results
All times are local (UTC+7).

First round

Pool A

Pool B

Second round

Fifth to ninth place classification
7–9th place bracket

Crossover

Seventh and eighth place

Fifth and sixth place

First to fourth place classification

Semifinals

Third and fourth place

Final

Final standings

References

2018
Sports competitions in Bangkok
2018 sports events in Bangkok
April 2018 sports events in Asia
Field hockey at the 2018 Summer Youth Olympics